Albert Gillison Worth (1 February 1888 – 1971) was an English professional footballer who played as a winger.

References

1888 births
1971 deaths
People from Broughton, Greater Manchester
English footballers
Association football wingers
Stockport County F.C. players
Rochdale A.F.C. players
Grimsby Town F.C. players
Luton Town F.C. players
Heywood United F.C. players
Hyde United F.C. players
English Football League players